Shirley Mac McVicker Marsh (June 22, 1925 – June 8, 2014) was an American politician and social worker.

Biography
Born in Benton, Illinois, Marsh received her bachelor's and master's degrees from University of Nebraska–Lincoln in social welfare. Her husband was Frank Marsh who served as Lieutenant Governor of Nebraska from 1971 to 1975 and lived in Lincoln, Nebraska where she had graduated from Lincoln High School. She was a member of the Republican Party and was elected to the Nebraska State Legislature in 1973. Marsh died in Lincoln, Nebraska.

Notes

External links
Shirley Marsh-obituary

1925 births
2014 deaths
People from Benton, Illinois
Politicians from Lincoln, Nebraska
University of Nebraska–Lincoln alumni
Women state legislators in Nebraska
Republican Party Nebraska state senators
21st-century American women